David Drew   was a Major League Baseball shortstop who played in two games for the Philadelphia Keystones and 13 games for the Washington Nationals of the Union Association in 1884.

External links

Major League Baseball shortstops
19th-century baseball players
Washington Nationals (UA) players
Philadelphia Keystones players
Johnstown (minor league baseball) players